Joseph Dolhon (July 9, 1927 – January 5, 1981) was an American professional basketball player. He spent two seasons in the National Basketball Association, both with the Baltimore Bullets (1949–51). He attended Saunders Trades and Technical High School in Yonkers, New York and went on to attend New York University.

After retiring from playing professional basketball, he became a teacher in the New York City public school system. He was killed on January 5, 1981, in a car accident in Westchester County, New York.

NBA career statistics

Regular season

References

External links

1927 births
1981 deaths
Baltimore Bullets (1944–1954) players
Basketball players from New York (state)
NYU Violets men's basketball players
Sportspeople from Yonkers, New York
American men's basketball players
Guards (basketball)
Road incident deaths in New York (state)